The Legion of the Condemned (aka Legion of the Condemned) is a 1928 American silent film directed by William A. Wellman and produced by Jesse L. Lasky, Wellman, and Adolph Zukor and  distributed by Paramount Pictures. Written by former World War I flight instructor John Monk Saunders and Jean de Limur, with intertitles by George Marion, Jr., the film stars Fay Wray and Gary Cooper.

Plot
In World War I, four young men from various walks of life sign up as flyers for the Lafayette Escadrille, a military unit known as "The Legion of the Condemned". The unit is composed mostly of American volunteer pilots flying fighter aircraft. All four men are running away from something: the law, love, or themselves. Whenever a dangerous mission comes up, the four men draw cards to see who will fly off to near-certain doom. With his best friend Byron Dashwood (Barry Norton) already having died in combat, Gale Price (Gary Cooper) draws the high card next time around.

As he prepares to drop a spy behind enemy lines, Gale remembers the events leading up to this moment - recounting his ill-fated romance with Christine Charteris (Fay Wray), whom he now believes to be a German spy. As he approaches his aircraft, Gale discovers that his passenger is Christine, who is actually an operative in the French secret service. Before she can explain her true identity, Gale is obliged to fly Christine to her rendezvous point.

Both young people are captured with Christine sentenced to be executed as a spy. Just before they go to the firing squad, a bombing raid takes place. Afterward, they are rescued by their unit and reconciled.

Cast

 Gary Cooper as Gale Price
 Fay Wray as Christine Charteris
 Barry Norton as Byron Dashwood
 Lane Chandler as Charles Holabird
 Francis McDonald as Gonzolo Vasquez
 George Voya as Robert Montagnal
 Freeman Wood as Richard De Witt (credited as George Wood)
 Albert Conti as Von Hohendorff
 Charlotte Bird as Celeste
 Toto Guette as Mechanic

Production

Fresh from their successful collaboration on Wings (1927), Saunders and Wellman embarked on a similar story, suggested by Wellman. Myron Selznick, who acted as both a talent agent and his promotor, advised Wellman to pursue Paramount Pictures and ensure his future as a director with this film.

Wellman utilized footage from the earlier "mountain" of unused film footage of aerial scenes in Wings, but new sequences were also shot at the Griffith Park Airport. Production began on October 27, 1927 with principal photography completed a month later. A small "air force" was assembled, using some of the same aircraft that had appeared in Wings including three DH.4s, two Fokker D.VIIs, a Thomas-Morse MB-3 and SPAD S.VII. 

While in production, studio management had second thoughts about recycling so much of the earlier footage, and had Wellman remove some of the scenes from Wings.

Reception
Notable as the first film to star Gary Cooper, who had a secondary role in Wings, The Legion of the Condemned
received mixed reviews from critics. Mordaunt Hall, writing in The New York Times, noted: "William A. Wellman and John Monk Saunders, the two young men who were responsible for that significant production, 'Wings,' have contributed to the screen another melodrama of the warriors of the clouds. This new feature, 'The Legion of the Condemned,' has an excellent underlying motive, but in endeavoring to give love its place on the battlefield, the producer and the author have not exactly neglected opportunities for pictorial license. The suspense is piled on in the last chapter; but, judging by the demonstrative approval of the audience at one juncture, this was more than moderately successful."

Preservation status
No copies of The Legion of the Condemned are known to have survived, and it is now considered a lost film.

See also
 Lafayette Escadrille (1958)
 Flyboys (2006)
List of lost films

References

Notes

Citations

Bibliography

 Beck, Simon D. The Aircraft-Spotter's Film and Television Companion. Jefferson, North Carolina: McFarland and Company, 2016. .
 Orriss, Bruce W. When Hollywood Ruled the Skies: The Aviation Film Classics of World War I. Los Angeles: Aero Associates, 2013. .
 Paris, Michael. From the Wright Brothers to Top Gun: Aviation, Nationalism, and Popular Cinema. Manchester, UK: Manchester University Press, 1995. .
 Pendo, Stephen. Aviation in the Cinema. Lanham, Maryland: Scarecrow Press, 1985. .
 Wynne, H. Hugh. The Motion Picture Stunt Pilots and Hollywood's Classic Aviation Movies. Missoula, Montana: Pictorial Histories Publishing Co., 1987. .

External links
 
 
 
 The Legion of the Condemned at SilentEra
 The Legion of the Condemned at Virtual History

1928 films
American aviation films
American silent feature films
1928 lost films
Lost American films
Films directed by William A. Wellman
World War I aviation films
Lafayette Escadrille
American black-and-white films
1920s American films
Silent war films